Kempt Road  is a small community in the Canadian province of Nova Scotia, located in Richmond County on Cape Breton Island.

Origins of Name
Kempt Road is named after General Sir James Kempt, who served as Lieutenant-Governor of Nova Scotia from 1820 to 1828, about the time this area was first settled by Europeans.

References
Kempt Road  on Destination Nova Scotia

Communities in Richmond County, Nova Scotia
General Service Areas in Nova Scotia